Dawid Lampart (born 4 August 1990) is a Polish  motorcycle speedway rider who was a member of the Poland U-21 and U-19 national teams. Lampart won the 2009 Under-21 World Cup, 2009 Team U-19 European Championship and finished third at the 2009 Individual Speedway Junior Polish Championship.

Career details

World Championships 
 Individual U-21 World Championship
 2009 - Lost in Domestic Qualifications
 Team U-21 World Championship (Under-21 World Cup)
 2009 -  Gorzów Wlkp. - U-21 World Champion (5 pts)

European Championships 

 Individual U-19 European Championship
 2008 -  Stralsund - 11th place (7 pts)
 2009 -  Tarnów - 9th place (7 pts)
 Team U-19 European Championship
 2008 -  Rawicz - 4th place (7 pts)
 2009 -  Holsted - U-19 European Champion (7 pts)

Domestic competitions 

 Individual Polish Championship
 2009 - 16th place in Semi-Final 2
 Individual U-21 Polish Championship
 2008 -  Rybnik - 13th place (4 pts)
 2009 -  Leszno - 3rd place (12 pts)
 Team U-21 Polish Championship
 2007 -  Rybnik - 3rd place for Rzeszów (12 pts) - Average 2.100
 2008 - 4th place in Group C
 Silver Helmet (U-21)
 2008 -  Rzeszów - 5th place (11 pts)
 2009 -  Częstochowa - 4th place (11 pts)
 Bronze Helmet (U-19)
 2008 -  Gdańsk - 9th place (6 pts)
 2009 -  Wrocław - 8th place (7 pts)

See also 
 Poland national speedway team
 Speedway in Poland

References

External links 
 Rider profile at www.Stal.Rzeszow.pl

Polish speedway riders
1990 births
Living people
Team Speedway Junior European Champions
Place of birth missing (living people)